Farnes Church is a parish church of the Church of Norway in Årdal Municipality in Vestland county, Norway. It is located in the village of Øvre Årdal. It is the church for the Øvre Årdal parish which is part of the Sogn prosti (deanery) in the Diocese of Bjørgvin.

The large, red, brick church was built in a modern, cruciform design in 1970 using plans drawn up by the architect Per Solemslie from the architecture firm Arnstein Arneberg. The church seats about 648 people.

History
Historically, the only church in Årdal was the old Årdal Church located in Årdalstangen. In 1867, the old stave church in Årdalstangen was going to be torn down, the local priest and the bishop both wanted a new replacement church to be built in the village of Øvre Årdal. The municipal council said no, and a new church was built in Årdalstangen.

After World War II, the growing community of Øvre Årdal continued to ask for their own church. A small building in Øvre Årdal began to be used as an interim church in 1954. Planning for a permanent church began in the 1960s. Originally, the designs were for a very traditional granite building with a tower and spire, but the final design was a much more modern, brick building.

Construction began in June 1968. The church was consecrated on 12 April 1970 by the bishop Per Juvkam. When the new church opened, the Årdal parish was divided into two, with Årdal Church serving the southwest part of the municipality and this new church serving the northeastern part.

See also
List of churches in Bjørgvin

References

Årdal
Churches in Vestland
Brick churches in Norway
Cruciform churches in Norway
20th-century Church of Norway church buildings
Churches completed in 1970
1970 establishments in Norway